Tonomura (written: 外村) is a Japanese surname. Notable people with the surname include:

Akira Tonomura (1942–2012), Japanese physicist
Hisashi Tonomura (born 1972), Japanese musician
Shigeru Tonomura (1902-1961), Japanese author

Japanese-language surnames